Stanley Douglas Duff (Q1 1919 – 9 September 1941) was an English professional footballer who played as a winger in the Football League for Tranmere Rovers, Chester, and New Brighton.

Personal life
Duff served as a leading aircraftman in the Royal Air Force Volunteer Reserve during the Second World War. Stationed at No. 5 Observer School, he was killed serving as a wireless operator aboard Bristol Blenheim L8693 when the aircraft crashed in a training accident on 9 September 1941. Duff is buried at the Liverpool Anfield Cemetery.

Career statistics

References

1919 births
1941 deaths
Date of birth missing
Footballers from Liverpool
Association football wingers
English footballers
English Football League players
League of Ireland players
Military personnel from Liverpool
English expatriate footballers
English expatriate sportspeople in Ireland
England amateur international footballers
Liverpool F.C. players
Leicester City F.C. players
Tranmere Rovers F.C. players
Waterford F.C. players
Chester F.C. players
New Brighton A.F.C. players
Royal Air Force Volunteer Reserve personnel of World War II
Royal Air Force airmen
Royal Air Force personnel killed in World War II
Victims of aviation accidents or incidents in the United Kingdom
Victims of aviation accidents or incidents in 1941
Burials at Anfield Cemetery